Álvaro Silva may refer to:

 Álvaro Silva (athlete) (born 1965), Portuguese sprinter
 Álvaro Silva (fencer) (born 1920), Portuguese fencer
 Álvaro Silva (footballer) (born 1984), Spanish–Filipino footballer
 Álvaro Silva Calderón (born 1929), Venezuelan Secretary General of OPEC during 2002–2003